Correct logo: https://www.svenskalag.se/alingsasiffotboll/dokument/beca3313-2b92-4ed4-8fd9-71567e9a4822/BEAA5CD1-F7F8-41C9-A19B-805416F4C376.png
Alingsås IF is a Swedish football club located in Alingsås in Västra Götaland County.

2023 Alingsås IF FF has a women’s team in Elitettan and a men’s team in Division 4.

Background
Alingsås Idrottsförening were formed in 1906 and are one of the oldest and most prestigious clubs in Alingsås.  The club has almost 1,000 members of which 400 are active in football, 250 in athletics and 270 in gymnastics.

Since their foundation Alingsås IF has participated mainly in the middle divisions of the Swedish football league system.  The club currently plays in Division 3 Mellersta Götaland which is the fifth tier of Swedish football. AIF have played six seasons in Division 2, which was then the second tier of Swedish football, in 1924/25, 1936/37, 1937/38, 1966, 1967 and 1968.  They play their home matches at the Mjörnvallen in Alingsås. This facility is located next to the beautiful lakeside Mjörn beach, and includes three 11-a-side pitches and a 5 a-side pitch.

Alingsås IF are affiliated to Västergötlands Fotbollförbund.

Recent history
In recent seasons Alingsås IF have competed in the following divisions:

2013 – Division III, Mellersta Götaland
2012 – Division III, Mellersta Götaland
2011 – Division III, Mellersta Götaland
2010 – Division IV, Västergötland Västra
2009 – Division IV, Västergötland Västra
2008 – Division IV, Västergötland Västra
2007 – Division III, Mellersta Götaland
2006 – Division IV, Västergötland Södra
2005 – Division IV, Västergötland Västra
2004 – Division IV, Västergötland Södra
2003 – Division IV, Västergötland Södra
2002 – Division IV, Västergötland Västra
2001 – Division IV, Västergötland Västra
2000 – Division V, Västra Älvsborg
1999 – Division V, Västra Älvsborg
1998 – Division IV, Västergötland Västra
1997 – Division IV, Västergötland Västra
1996 – Division III, Nordvästra Götaland
1995 – Division II, Västra Götaland
1994 – Division III, Mellersta Götaland
1993 – Division III, Mellersta Götaland

Attendances

In recent seasons Alingsås IF have had the following average attendances:

Footnotes

External links
 Alingsås IF – Official website
 Alingsås IF on Facebook

Sport in Västra Götaland County
Football clubs in Västra Götaland County
Athletics clubs in Sweden
Association football clubs established in 1906
1906 establishments in Sweden